This list of burials at Vestre Cemetery lists notable burials at Vestre Cemetery in Copenhagen, Denmark.

List

External links
 Full list at kendtegravsteder.dk
 

Burials at Vestre Cemetery, Copenhagen
Vestre Cemetery